Lawrence Adam Nuesslein (May 16, 1895 – May 10, 1971) was an American sport shooter who competed in the 1920 Summer Olympics. He won a total of five Olympic medals: two gold, one silver, and two bronze.

Personal life
Nuesslein was born in Ridgefield Park, New Jersey, and died in Allentown, Pennsylvania.

Legacy
Nuesslein has been inducted into the USA Shooting Hall of fame.

References

1895 births
1971 deaths
American male sport shooters
Shooters at the 1920 Summer Olympics
Olympic gold medalists for the United States in shooting
Olympic silver medalists for the United States in shooting
Olympic bronze medalists for the United States in shooting
Medalists at the 1920 Summer Olympics
People from Ridgefield Park, New Jersey
Sportspeople from Bergen County, New Jersey
19th-century American people
20th-century American people